The 2004 Pavel Roman Memorial was the 10th edition of an annual international ice dancing competition held in Olomouc, Czech Republic. The event was held between November 19 and 21, 2004. Ice dancers competed in the senior, junior, and novice levels.

Results

Senior

External links
 Results

Pavel Roman Memorial, 2004
Pavel Roman Memorial